Michael Derek Elworthy Jarman (31 January 1942 – 19 February 1994) was an English artist, film maker, costume designer, stage designer, writer, gardener and gay rights activist.

Biography

Jarman was born at the Royal Victoria Nursing Home in Northwood, Middlesex, England, the son of Elizabeth Evelyn (née Puttock) and Lancelot Elworthy Jarman. His father was a Royal Air Force officer, born in New Zealand.

After a prep school education at Hordle House School, Jarman went on to board at Canford School in Dorset and from 1960 studied at King's College London. This was followed by four years at the Slade School of Fine Art, University College London (UCL), starting in 1963. He had a studio at Butler's Wharf, London, in the 1970s. Jarman was outspoken about homosexuality, his public fight for gay rights, and his personal struggle with AIDS.

On 22 December 1986, Jarman was diagnosed as HIV positive and discussed his condition in public. His illness prompted him to move to Prospect Cottage, Dungeness, in Kent, near the nuclear power station. In 1994, he died of an AIDS-related illness in London, aged 52. He was an atheist. He is buried in the graveyard at St Clement's Church, Old Romney, Kent.

In his last years, Jarman was emotionally and practically supported by the companionship of Keith Collins, a young man he had met in 1987. While not lovers (Collins had his own partner), the friendship became essential for both of them. Jarman left Prospect Cottage to him.

A blue plaque commemorating Jarman was unveiled at Butler's Wharf in London on 19 February 2019, the 25th anniversary of his death.

Films
Jarman's first films were experimental Super 8mm shorts, a form he never entirely abandoned, and later developed further in his films Imagining October (1984), The Angelic Conversation (1985), The Last of England (1987) and The Garden (1990) as a parallel to his narrative work. The Garden was entered into the 17th Moscow International Film Festival. The Angelic Conversation featured Toby Mott and other members of the Grey Organisation, a radical artist collective.

Jarman first became known as a stage designer. His break in the film industry came as production designer for Ken Russell's The Devils (1971). He made his mainstream narrative filmmaking debut with Sebastiane (1976), about the martyrdom of Saint Sebastian. This was one of the first British films to feature positive images of gay sexuality; its dialogue was entirely in Latin.

He followed this with Jubilee (shot 1977, released 1978), in which Queen Elizabeth I of England is seen to be transported forward in time to a desolate and brutal wasteland ruled by her twentieth-century namesake. Jubilee has been described as "Britain's only decent punk film", and featured punk groups and figures such as Jayne County of Wayne County & the Electric Chairs, Jordan, Toyah Willcox, Adam and the Ants and The Slits.

This was followed in 1979 by an adaptation of Shakespeare's The Tempest.

During the 1980s, Jarman was a leading campaigner against Clause 28, which sought to ban the "promotion" of homosexuality in schools. He also worked to raise awareness of AIDS. His artistic practice in the early 1980s reflected these commitments, especially in The Angelic Conversation (1985), a film in which the imagery is accompanied by Judi Dench's voice reciting Shakespeare's sonnets.

Jarman spent seven years making experimental Super 8mm films and attempting to raise money for Caravaggio (he later claimed to have rewritten the script seventeen times during this period). Released in 1986, Caravaggio attracted a comparatively wide audience; it is still, barring the cult hit Jubilee, probably Jarman's most widely known work. This is partly due to the involvement, for the first time with a Jarman film, of the British television company Channel 4 in funding and distribution. Funded by the British Film Institute and produced by film theorist Colin MacCabe, Caravaggio became Jarman's most famous film to date, and marked the beginning of a new phase in his filmmaking career: from then onwards, all his films would be partly funded by television companies, often receiving their most prominent exhibition in TV screenings. Caravaggio also saw Jarman work with actress Tilda Swinton for the first time. Overt depictions of homosexual love, narrative ambiguity, and the live representations of Caravaggio's most famous paintings are all prominent features in the film.

The conclusion of Caravaggio also marked the beginning of a temporary abandonment of traditional narrative in Jarman's films. Frustrated by the formality of 35mm film production, and by the dependence on institutions and the resultant prolonged inactivity associated with it (which had already cost him seven years with Caravaggio, as well as derailing several long-term projects), Jarman returned to and expanded the super 8mm-based form he had previously worked in on Imagining October and The Angelic Conversation. Caravaggio was entered into the 36th Berlin International Film Festival, where it won the Silver Bear for an outstanding single achievement.

The first film to result from this new semi-narrative phase, The Last of England told the death of a country, ravaged by its own internal decay and the economic restructuring of Thatcher's government. "Wrenchingly beautiful … the film is one of the few commanding works of personal cinema in the late 80's – a call to open our eyes to a world violated by greed and repression, to see what irrevocable damage has been wrought on city, countryside and soul, how our skies, our bodies, have turned poisonous", wrote a Village Voice critic.

In 1989, Jarman's film War Requiem produced by Don Boyd brought Laurence Olivier out of retirement for what would be Olivier's last screen performance. The film uses Benjamin Britten's eponymous anti-war requiem as its soundtrack and juxtaposes violent footage of war with the mass for the dead and the passionate humanist poetry of Wilfred Owen.

During the making of his film The Garden, Jarman became seriously ill. Although he recovered sufficiently to complete the work, he never attempted anything on a comparable scale afterwards, returning to a more pared-down form for his concluding narrative films, Edward II (perhaps his most politically outspoken work, informed by his gay activism) and the Brechtian Wittgenstein, a delicate tragicomedy based on the life of the philosopher Ludwig Wittgenstein. Jarman made a side income by directing music videos for various artists, including Marianne Faithfull, The Smiths and the Pet Shop Boys.

By the time of his 1993 film Blue, Jarman was losing his sight and dying of AIDS-related complications. Blue consists of a single shot of saturated blue colour filling the screen, as background to a soundtrack composed by Simon Fisher Turner, and featuring original music by Coil and other artists, in which Jarman describes his life and vision. When it was shown on British television, Channel 4 carried the image whilst the soundtrack was broadcast simultaneously on BBC Radio 3. Blue was unveiled at the 1993 Venice Biennale with Jarman in attendance and subsequently entered the collections of the Walker Art Institute; Centre Georges Pompidou, MoMA and Tate. His final work as a film-maker was the film Glitterbug, made for the Arena slot on BBC Two, and broadcast shortly after Jarman's death.

Other works

Jarman's work broke new ground in creating and expanding the fledgling form of 'the pop video' in England (eg. using his father's WWII archival footage (one of the first people to use a color home movie camera which included the director as a toddler) on the early version of Wang Chung's "Dance Hall Days"), and in gay rights activism.  Several volumes of his diaries have been published.

Jarman also directed the 1989 tour by the UK duo Pet Shop Boys.> By pop concert standards this was a highly theatrical event with costume and specially shot films accompanying the individual songs. Jarman was the stage director of Sylvano Bussotti's opera L'Ispirazione, first staged in Florence in 1988.

Jarman is also remembered for his famous shingle cottage-garden at Prospect Cottage, created in the latter years of his life, in the shadow of Dungeness nuclear power station. The cottage is built in vernacular style in timber, with tar-based weatherproofing, like others nearby. Raised wooden text on the side of the cottage is the first stanza and the last five lines of the last stanza of John Donne's poem, The Sun Rising. The cottage garden was made by arranging flotsam washed up nearby, interspersed with endemic salt-loving beach plants, both set against the bright shingle. The garden has been the subject of several books. At this time, Jarman also began painting again.

Jarman was the author of several books including his autobiography Dancing Ledge (1984), which details his life until the age 40. He provides his own insight on the history of gay life in London (60's-80's), discusses his own acceptance of his homosexuality at age 16 and accounts of the financial and emotional hardships of a life devoted to filmmaking. A collection of poetry A Finger in the Fishes Mouth, two volumes of diaries Modern Nature and Smiling In Slow Motion and two treatises on his work in film and art The Last of England (also published as Kicking the Pricks) and Chroma.

Other notable published works include film scripts (Up in the Air, Blue, War Requiem, Caravaggio, Queer Edward II and Wittgenstein: The Terry Eagleton Script/The Derek Jarman Film), a study of his garden at Dungeness Derek Jarman's Garden, and At Your Own Risk, a defiant celebration of gay sexuality.

Musical tributes
After his death, the band Chumbawamba released "Song for Derek Jarman" in his honour. Andi Sexgang released the CD Last of England as a Jarman tribute. The ambient experimental album The Garden Is Full of Metal by Robin Rimbaud included Jarman speech samples.

Manic Street Preachers' bassist Nicky Wire recorded a track titled "Derek Jarman's Garden" as a b-side to his single "Break My Heart Slowly" (2006). On his album In the Mist, released in 2011, ambient composer Harold Budd features a song titled "The Art of Mirrors (after Derek Jarman)".

Coil, which in 1985 contributed a soundtrack for Jarman's The Angelic Conversation released the 7" single "Themes for Derek Jarman's Blue" in 1993. In 2004, Coil's Peter Christopherson performed his score for the Jarman short The Art of Mirrors as a tribute to Jarman live at L'étrange Festival in Paris. In 2015, record label Black Mass Rising released a recording of the performance. In 2018, composer Gregory Spears created a work for chorus and string quartet, titled "The Tower and the Garden", commissioned by conductors Donald Nally, Mark Shapiro, Robert Geary and Carmen-Helena Téllez, setting a poem by Keith Garebian from his collection "Blue: The Derek Jarman Poems" (2008).

The French musician and composer Romain Frequency released his first album Research on a nameless colour in 2020 as a tribute to Jarman's final collection of Essays “Chroma” released in 1994, the year he died and written while struggling with illness (facing the irony of an artist going blind).
The songs are devoted to an unexisting colour and their attendant emotion as a transposition of a certain contemplative state into sound.
The album received a positive response from the press.

Filmography

Feature films
 Sebastiane (1976)
 Jubilee (1978)
 The Tempest (1979)
 The Angelic Conversation (1985)
 Caravaggio (1986)
 The Last of England (1987)
 War Requiem (1989)
 The Garden (1990)
 Edward II (1991)
 Wittgenstein (1993)
 Blue (1993)

Short films
 Studio Bankside (1971)
 Electric Fairy (1971)
 Garden of Luxor (aka Burning the Pyramids 1972)
 Burning the Pyramids (1972)
 Miss Gaby (1972)
 A Journey to Avebury (1971)
 Andrew Logan Kisses the Glitterati (1972)
 At Low Tide (1972)
 Tarot (aka the Magician, 1972)
 Art of Mirrors (1973)
 Sulphur (1973)
 Stolen Apples for Karen Blixen (1973)
 Ashden's Walk on Møn (1973)
 Miss World (1973)
 The Devils at the Elgin (aka Reworking the Devils, 1974)
 Fire Island (1974)
 Duggie Fields (1974)
 Ulla's Fete (aka Ulla's Chandelier, 1975)
 Picnic at Ray's (1975)
 Sebastiane Wrap (1975)
 The Making of Sebastiane (1975)
 Sea of Storms (1976)
 Sloane Square: A Room of One's Own (1976)
 Gerald's Film (1976)
 Art and the Pose (1976)
 Houston Texas (1976)
 Jordan's Dance (1977)
 Every Woman for Herself and All for Art (1977)
 The Pantheon (1978)
 In the Shadow of the Sun (1974) (in 1981 Throbbing Gristle was commissioned to provide a new soundtrack for this 54-minute film)
 T.G.: Psychic Rally in Heaven (1981)
 Jordan's Wedding (1981)
 Waiting for Waiting for Godot (1982)
 Pontormo and Punks at Santa Croce (1982)
 B2 Tape (1983)
 The Dream Machine (1983) (Consists of multiple short vignettes of previous works)
 Witches Song (1979)
 Broken English (1979)
 Ballad Of Lucy Jordan (1979)
 Pirate Tape (1983)
 T.G.: Psychic Rally In Heaven (1981).
 Imagining October (1984)
 Pirate Tape (William S. Burroughs Film) (1987)
 Aria (1987)
segment: Depuis le Jour
 L'Ispirazione (1988)
 Coil: Egyptian Basses (1993)
The Clearing (1994)
 Glitterbug (1994) (one-hour compilation film of various Super-8 shorts with music by Brian Eno)
 Will You Dance With Me?" (2014) (filmed in 1984 but released posthumously)

Jarman's early Super-8 mm work has been included on some of the DVD releases of his films.

Music videos
 The Sex Pistols: The Sex Pistols Number One (1977)
 Marianne Faithfull: "Broken English", "Witches' Song", and "The Ballad of Lucy Jordan" (1979)
 Throbbing Gristle: "TG Psychic Rally in Heaven" (1981)
 The Lords of the New Church: "Dance With Me" (1983)
 Carmel: "Willow Weep for Me" (1983)
 Wang Chung: "Dance Hall Days" (first version) (1983)
 Psychic TV Jordi Valls: "Catalan" (1984)
 Language:  "Touch The Radio Dance" (1984) (shown at the Museum of Modern Art in New York City)
 Wide Boy Awake Billy Hyena (1984)
 Orange Juice: "What Presence?!" (1984)
 Marc Almond: "Tenderness Is a Weakness" (1984)
 Bryan Ferry: "Windswept" (1985)
 The Smiths:
 The Queen Is Dead, a short film incorporating the Smiths songs "The Queen Is Dead", "Panic", and "There Is a Light That Never Goes Out" (1986)
 The "Panic" sequence from The Queen Is Dead was edited to form the video for that single (1986)
 "Ask" (1986)
 Easterhouse: "1969" and "Whistling in the Dark" (1986)
 Matt Fretton: "Avatar" (unreleased) (1986)
 The Mighty Lemon Drops "Out of Hand" (1987)
 Bob Geldof: "I Cry Too" and "In The Pouring Rain" (1987)
 Pet Shop Boys: "It's a Sin" (1987), "Rent" (1987), several concert projections (released as Projections in 1993), and "Violence" (1995)
 Suede: "The Next Life" (1993)
 Patti Smith: "Memorial Tribute" (1993)

Scenic design
 Jazz Calendar at Covent Garden.
 Don Giovanni at the Coliseum
 The Devils, directed by Ken Russell
 Savage Messiah, directed by Ken Russell
 The Rake's Progress, directed by Ken Russell in Florence
 1991: Waiting for Godot by Samuel Beckett at the Queen's Theatre in the West End

Film and television works prompted by Jarman's life and work
The Last Paintings of Derek Jarman (Mark Jordan, Granada TV 1995). Broadcast by Granada TV and shown at the San Francisco Frameline Film Festival. Includes footage of Jarman producing his final works. Guests included Margi Clarke, Toyah Wilcox, Brett Anderson, and Jon Savage. To coincide with the broadcast the exhibition, Evil Queen was premiered at the Whitworth Art Gallery, Manchester. (Contact BFI for footage).
Derek Jarman: Life as Art (2004): a film exploring Derek Jarman's life and films by 400Blows Productions/Andy Kimpton-Nye, featuring Tilda Swinton, Simon Fisher Turner, Chris Hobbs and narrated by John Quentin. Broadcast on Sky Arts and screened at film festivals around the world, including Buenos Aires, Cork, London, Leeds, Philadelphia and Turin.
Derek (2008): a biography of Jarman's life and work, directed by Isaac Julien and written and narrated by Tilda Swinton.
Red Duckies (2006): Short film directed by Luke Seomore and Joseph Bull, featuring a voice-over from Simon Fisher Turner commissioned by Dazed & Confused for World Aids Day 2006.
Delphinium: A Childhood Portrait of Derek Jarman (2009): a "stylized and lyrical coming-of-age" short film combining narrative and documentary elements directed by Matthew Mishory depicting Jarman's "artistic, sexual, and political awakening in postwar England". Jarman's surviving muse Keith Collins and Siouxsie and the Banshees founder Steven Severin both participated in the making of the film, which had its world premiere at the 2009 Reykjavik International Film Festival in Iceland, its UK premiere at the Raindance Film Festival in London, and its California premiere at the 2010 Frameline International Film Festival in San Francisco. In 2011, the film was installed permanently in the British Film Institute's National Film Archive in London.
The Gospel According to St Derek (Andy Kimpton-Nye/400Blows Productions, 2014): screened at the King's College Early Modern Exhibition, the Pacific Film Archive - Berekeley Art Museum, the Australian cinematheque and on the Guardian website, this 40 mins documentary bears witness to Derek Jarman’s unique approach to low-budget film-making and his near-alchemical ability to turn the base components of film-making in to artistic gold.
Saintmaking: Derek Jarman and the Sisters of Perpetual Indulgence (2021): a documentary by Marco Alessi, commissioned by The Guardian to commemorate the 30th anniversary of Jarman's canonisation into the first British living gay saint by the group of queer activist nuns, the Sisters of Perpetual Indulgence.

See also
 LGBT culture in London

References

Further reading
 Robert Mills, Derek Jarman's Medieval Modern (D.S. Brewer, 2018), 
 Niall Richardson, 'The Queer Cinema of Derek Jarman: Critical and Cultural Readings' (I.B. Tauris, 2009)
 Michael Charlesworth, Derek Jarman (Reaktion, 2011)
 Martin Frey. Derek Jarman – Moving Pictures of a Painter. (INGRAM Content Group Inc., 2016), 
 Steven Dillon.  Derek Jarman and Lyric Film: The Mirror and the Sea. (2004).
 Tony Peake.  Derek Jarman (Little, Brown & Co, 2000).  600-page biography.
 Michael O'Pray.  Derek Jarman: Dreams of England.  (British Film Institute, 1996).
 Howard Sooley.  Derek Jarman's Garden.  (Thames & Hudson, 1995).
 Derek Jarman. 'Modern Nature' (Diaries 1989–1990)
 Derek Jarman. 'Smiling in Slow Motion' (Diaries 1991–1994)
 Derek Jarman. 'Dancing Ledge' (Memoir. )
'Evil Queen' exhibition catalogue. Foreword by Mark Jordan 
Derek Jarman. 'At Your Own Risk' (Memoir, Thames & Hudson, 1991) 
 Judith Noble. "The Wedding of Light and Matter: Alchemy and Magic in the Films of Derek Jarman." In Visions of Enchantment: Occultism, Magic, and Visual Culture, eds. Daniel Zamani, Judith Noble, and Merlin Cox (London: Fulgur Press, 2019), pp. 168–181

External links

Bibliography of books and articles about Jarman via UC Berkeley Media Resources center
 
 Derek Jarman: Radical Traditionalist
 Preserving A Harlequin – a Jarman retrospective by Nick Clapson
 

 Photographs of Prospect Cottage & garden details at Flickr
 Derek Jarman; On lyrical love and dedication
 Audio recording of Derek Jarman interviewed by Ken Campbell at the ICA, London, 7 February 1984
 Link to correspondence between Derek Jarman and Angelique Rockas
 Time is away show  on NTS Radio.

1942 births
1994 deaths
20th-century atheists
20th-century diarists
20th-century English male artists
20th-century English memoirists
20th-century English screenwriters
20th-century English LGBT people
AIDS-related deaths in England
Alumni of King's College London
Alumni of the Slade School of Fine Art
Artists from London
BAFTA Outstanding British Contribution to Cinema Award
English diarists
English atheist writers
English experimental filmmakers
English gardeners
English gay writers
English gay artists
English health activists
English male screenwriters
English music video directors
English people of Jewish descent
English people of New Zealand descent
Film directors from London
Gay memoirists
Gay screenwriters
HIV/AIDS activists
LGBT film directors
English LGBT rights activists
English LGBT screenwriters
People educated at Canford School
People educated at Walhampton School and Hordle House School
People from Northwood, London
Writers from London
Collage filmmakers